Jeffrey Tyrone Webster (born February 19, 1971) is an American former professional basketball player.

Webster played collegiately for the University of Oklahoma, where he scored 2,258 points and collected 781 rebounds.

Webster was selected 40th overall by the Miami Heat in the 1994 NBA draft, but he and fellow Heat draftee Ed Stokes were traded to the Washington Bullets in exchange for Rex Chapman and the draft rights to Terrence Rencher. He played 11 games with the Bullets during the 1995–96 season before his brief NBA career came to an end.

Webster also played in the Continental Basketball Association for the Rapid City Thrillers, Tri-City Chinook and the Sioux Falls Skyforce.  His career averages were 3.9 points and 1.7 rebounds per game.

Webster's son Justin currently plays for the UNLV Runnin Rebs basketball team.

References

External links

1971 births
Living people
African-American basketball players
Basketball players from Arkansas
McDonald's High School All-Americans
Miami Heat draft picks
Oklahoma Sooners men's basketball players
Parade High School All-Americans (boys' basketball)
Rapid City Thrillers players
San-en NeoPhoenix players
Sioux Falls Skyforce (CBA) players
Small forwards
Sportspeople from Pine Bluff, Arkansas
Tri-City Chinook players
Washington Bullets players
American men's basketball players
Universiade medalists in basketball
Universiade gold medalists for the United States
21st-century African-American sportspeople
20th-century African-American sportspeople
American expatriate basketball people in Taiwan